Zajezda is a village in northern Croatia, located north of Budinščina and the D24 road, south of the Ivanšćica and east of Novi Marof.

References

Populated places in Krapina-Zagorje County